Kabu is a village near Along town in West Siang district of Arunachal Pradesh

References

Villages in West Siang district